K. Sedghi was an Iranian F-14 Tomcat fighter pilot in the Islamic Republic of Iran Air Force during the Iran–Iraq War. Sedghi has been credited with 5 confirmed aerial victories against Iraqi aircraft during the war, a record that qualifies him as a flying ace.

Career 

Confirmed victories of Sedghi include:

Operation Sultan 10 
At the time he ranked captain, Sedghi shot down four MiG-23s in a single operation, Operation Sultan 10, on 29 October 1980 with two AIM-9 Sidewinder and two AIM-54 Phoenix missiles. During the mission, he flew on a formation led by Col. Afshar with wingman Capt. M. Taibbe. When he engaged MiG-23s, he had penetrated deep Iraqi soil and was low on fuel, and managed to refuel before landing home safely. Three of the four pilots in the downed aircraft were confirmed dead, including Captain Ahmed Sabah who had two confirmed kills against Iranian F-5 Tigers.

See also

 List of Iranian flying aces

References 

Living people
Missing middle or first names
Year of birth missing (living people)
Iran–Iraq War flying aces
Iranian flying aces
Iranian military personnel of the Iran–Iraq War
Islamic Republic of Iran Air Force personnel